The MTV Russia Movie Awards (Before 2009 MTV Movie Awards Russia) made its debut in 2006 and have celebrated local Russian movies as well as International. The MTV Russia Movie Awards (RMA) is the first event of such kind, featuring local and international actors and movie celebrities being honoured by Russian viewers.

Host Cities
 April 21, 2006 – Oktyabrskiy Theatre, (Moscow) hosted by Dmitry Nagiev and Milla Jovovich
 April 19, 2007 – Pushkinskiy Theatre, (Moscow) hosted by Pamela Anderson and Ivan Urgant
 April 26, 2008 – Pushkinskiy Theatre, (Moscow) hosted by Paris Hilton
 April 23, 2009 – Barvikha Luxury Village Concert Hall, (Barvikha) hosted by Pavel Volya and Kseniya Sobchak

Award winners

2006

2007

See also
 MTV Russian Music Awards
 MTV Networks Europe

References

External links
 Official MMA'06 Russia Website
 Official MMA'07 Russia Website
 Official MMA'08 Russia Website
 Official MTV Russia Website

MTV
2006 establishments in Russia
Awards established in 2006
Awards disestablished in 2009